The 2018–19 network television schedule for the five major English-language commercial broadcast networks in the United States covers the prime time hours from September 2018 to August 2019. The schedule is followed by a list per network of returning series, new series, and series canceled after the 2017–18 season.

NBC was the first to announce its fall schedule on May 13, 2018, followed by Fox on May 14, ABC on May 15, CBS on May 16, and The CW on May 17, 2018.

On May 29, 2018, ABC removed Roseanne from its Tuesday lineup due to a controversial statement made by Roseanne Barr on Twitter about Valerie Jarrett, and replaced it with The Conners on June 21 for the fall.

PBS is not included, as member television stations have local flexibility over most of their schedules and broadcast times for network shows may vary. Ion Television and MyNetworkTV are also not included since both networks' schedules comprise syndicated reruns. The CW does not air network programming on Saturday nights.

New series are highlighted in bold.

Beginning with this season, The CW returned to programming a Sunday evening schedule for the first time since the 2008–09 season as of October 7 (the network commenced its regular Sunday schedule the following week, on October 14); programming airs on that night from 8 p.m. to 10 p.m. ET/PT, making it the only broadcast television network to not program the Sunday 7 p.m. ET/PT hour since that hour was given to the broadcast networks through the implementation of a 1975 amendment to the since-repealed Prime Time Access Rule (PTAR).

All times are U.S. Eastern and Pacific Time (except for some live sports or events). Subtract one hour for Central, Mountain, Alaska, and Hawaii-Aleutian times.

Each of the 30 highest-rated shows is listed with its rank and rating as determined by Nielsen Media Research.

Legend

Sunday

Note: ABC began airing American Idol live to allow Contiguous United States and Canadian CTV viewers to vote in all time zones in April, with the rebroadcasts airing in its regular time period in the Pacific, Alaska, Hawaii, and Guam time zones.

Monday

Tuesday

Wednesday

Thursday

Note: On Fox, the network's pre-game show (co-produced with NFL Network and entitled Fox NFL Thursday) starts at 7:30 p.m. ET out of primetime, preempting local programming. NBC will carry NFL football games consuming the entirety of prime time on September 6 and November 22, for the NFL Kickoff game and Thanksgiving Day game, respectively, which for ratings measurement and contract purposes are counted within the Sunday Night Football package.

Friday

Saturday

Note: NBC aired primetime coverage of Notre Dame college football on September 1, 29, and November 10, the 2019 NHL All-Star Game on January 26, a regional NHL Game of the Week on February 2, the 2019 NHL Stadium Series game on February 23, and first, second, and third round NHL playoff games in April and late May. CBS carried two primetime college football games (the Rip Miller Trophy game and the Alabama-LSU game), the NCAA men's basketball tournament for two Saturdays in late March, and two regional Alliance of American Football games on February 9.
Note: NBC's Pacific and Mountain Time Zone affiliates carry new episodes of Saturday Night Live in real time with the rest of the United States, placing its airtime within the prime time period throughout this season; a re-air is broadcast after the late local news in those time zones. The network's affiliates in Alaska, Hawaii and other Pacific islands carry the show on delay as usual.
Note: Fox and ABC's college football package airs live in all time zones, with local programming by affiliates in western time zones after game completion.

By network

ABC

Returning series:
20/20
The $100,000 Pyramid
Agents of S.H.I.E.L.D.
America's Funniest Home Videos
American Housewife
American Idol
The Bachelor
Bachelor in Paradise
The Bachelorette
Black-ish
Card Sharks (moved from Syndication)
Celebrity Family Feud
Child Support
Dancing with the Stars
For the People
Fresh Off the Boat
The Goldbergs
The Good Doctor
The Great American Baking Show
The Great Christmas Light Fight
Grey's Anatomy
How to Get Away with Murder
Match Game
Modern Family
NBA Saturday Primetime
Press Your Luck
Saturday Night Football
Shark Tank
Speechless
Splitting Up Together
Station 19
To Tell the Truth
What Would You Do?

New series:
1969 *
The Alec Baldwin Show
Bless This Mess *
The Conners
Dancing with the Stars: Juniors
Family Food Fight *
The Fix *
Grand Hotel *
Holey Moley *
The Kids Are Alright
A Million Little Things
Reef Break *
The Rookie
Schooled *
Single Parents
Videos After Dark *
Whiskey Cavalier *

Not returning from 2017–18:
Alex, Inc.
The Bachelor Winter Games
Castaways
The Crossing
Deception
Designated Survivor (moved to Netflix)
The Gong Show
Inhumans
Kevin (Probably) Saves the World
The Last Defense
The Mayor
The Middle
Once Upon a Time
The Proposal
Quantico
Roseanne 
Scandal
Take Two
Ten Days in the Valley
The Toy Box

CBS

Returning series:
48 Hours
60 Minutes
The Amazing Race
The Big Bang Theory
Big Brother
Blue Bloods
Bull
Celebrity Big Brother
Criminal Minds
Elementary
Hawaii Five-0
Instinct
Life in Pieces
MacGyver
Madam Secretary
Man with a Plan
Mom
Murphy Brown
NCIS
NCIS: Los Angeles
NCIS: New Orleans
Ransom
SEAL Team
Survivor
S.W.A.T.
Whistleblower
Young Sheldon

New series:
Blood & Treasure *
The Code *
Fam *
FBI
God Friended Me
The Good Fight *
Happy Together 
 Love Island *
Magnum P.I.
Million Dollar Mile *
The Neighborhood
The Red Line *
The World's Best *

Not returning from 2017–18:
9JKL
Code Black
Kevin Can Wait
Living Biblically
Me, Myself & I
Salvation
Scorpion
Superior Donuts
Thursday Night Football (moved to Fox)
TKO: Total Knock Out
Wisdom of the Crowd

The CW

Returning series:
The 100
Arrow
Black Lightning
Burden of Truth
Crazy Ex-Girlfriend
Dynasty
The Flash
I Ship It (moved from CW Seed)
iZombie 
Jane the Virgin
Legends of Tomorrow
Masters of Illusion
My Last Days
The Outpost
Penn & Teller: Fool Us
Riverdale
Supergirl
Supernatural
Whose Line Is It Anyway?

New series:
All American
The Big Stage *
Bulletproof *
Charmed
Hypnotize Me *
In the Dark *
Legacies
Mysteries Decoded *
Pandora *
Red Bull Peaking *
Roswell, New Mexico *
Two Sentence Horror Stories *

Not returning from 2017–18:
Life Sentence
The Originals
Valor

Fox

Returning series:
9-1-1
Baseball Night in America
Beat Shazam
Bob's Burgers
Empire
Family Guy
Fox College Football
The Gifted
Gordon Ramsay's 24 Hours to Hell and Back
Gotham
Hell's Kitchen
Last Man Standing (moved from ABC) 
Lethal Weapon
MasterChef
MasterChef Junior
NFL on Fox
The Orville
The OT
Paradise Hotel
The Resident
The Simpsons
So You Think You Can Dance
Star
Thursday Night Football (moved from CBS/NBC)

New series:
BH90210 *
The Cool Kids
First Responders Live *
The Masked Singer *
Mental Samurai *
The Passage *
Proven Innocent *
Rel
Spin the Wheel *
What Just Happened??! with Fred Savage *

Not returning from 2017–18:
Brooklyn Nine-Nine (moved to NBC)
The Exorcist
Ghosted
LA to Vegas
The Last Man on Earth
Love Connection
Lucifer (moved to Netflix)
The Mick
New Girl
Showtime at the Apollo
The X-Files

NBC

Returning series:
American Ninja Warrior
America's Got Talent
A.P. Bio
The Blacklist
Blindspot
Brooklyn Nine-Nine (moved from Fox)
Chicago Fire
Chicago Med
Chicago P.D.
Dateline NBC
Ellen's Game of Games
Football Night in America
Good Girls
The Good Place
Hollywood Game Night
Law & Order: Special Victims Unit
Midnight, Texas
NBC Sunday Night Football
Superstore
This Is Us
The Voice
The Wall
Will & Grace
World of Dance

New series:
Abby's *
America's Got Talent: The Champions *
Bring the Funny *
The Enemy Within *
I Feel Bad
The InBetween *
Manifest
New Amsterdam 
Songland *
The Titan Games *
The Village *

Not returning from 2017–18:
Better Late Than Never 
The Brave
Champions
Genius Junior
Great News
Law & Order True Crime
Making It (returned for 2019–20)
Marlon
Reverie
Rise
Running Wild with Bear Grylls (moved to National Geographic)
Shades of Blue
Taken
Thursday Night Football (moved to Fox)
Timeless
Trial & Error

Renewals and cancellations

Full season pickups

ABC
Grey's Anatomy—Picked up for three additional episodes on January 7, 2019, bringing the episode count to 25.
The Kids Are Alright—Picked up for a 22-episode full season on November 7, 2018; an additional episode was ordered on December 14, 2018, bringing the episode count to 23.
A Million Little Things—Picked up for a 17-episode full season on October 26, 2018.
The Rookie—Picked up for a 20-episode full season on November 5, 2018.
Single Parents—Picked up for a 22-episode full season on October 17, 2018; an additional episode was ordered on December 14, 2018, bringing the episode count to 23.
Splitting Up Together—Picked up for five additional episodes on November 7, 2018, bringing the episode count to 18.
Station 19—Picked up for a 17-episode full season on October 19, 2018.

CBS
FBI—Picked up for a 22-episode full season on October 11, 2018.
God Friended Me—Picked up for a 20-episode full season on October 19, 2018.
Magnum P.I.—Picked up for a 20-episode full season on October 19, 2018.
The Neighborhood—Picked up for a 22-episode full season on October 19, 2018.

The CW
All American—Picked up for three additional episodes on November 8, 2018, bringing the episode count to 16.
Charmed—Picked up for a 22-episode full season on November 8, 2018.
Legacies—Picked up for three additional episodes on November 8, 2018, bringing the episode count to 16.

Fox
The Cool Kids—Picked up for a 22-episode full season on October 19, 2018.
Lethal Weapon—Picked up for two additional episodes on October 12, 2018, bringing the episode count to 15.
The Resident—Picked up for a 22-episode full season on October 10, 2018.

NBC
Brooklyn Nine-Nine—Picked up for five additional episodes on September 7, 2018, bringing the episode count to 18.
Chicago Fire—Picked up for two additional episodes on September 7, 2018, bringing the episode count to 22.
Chicago Med—Picked up for two additional episodes on September 7, 2018, bringing the episode count to 22.
Chicago P.D.—Picked up for two additional episodes on September 7, 2018, bringing the episode count to 22.
Manifest—Picked up for three additional episodes on October 18, 2018, bringing the episode count to 16.
New Amsterdam—Picked up for a 22-episode full season on October 10, 2018.

Renewals

ABC
The $100,000 Pyramid—Renewed for a fifth season on November 20, 2019.
Agents of S.H.I.E.L.D.—Renewed for a seventh and final season on November 16, 2018.
America's Funniest Home Videos—Renewed for a thirtieth and thirty-first season on October 29, 2018.
American Housewife—Renewed for a fourth season on May 10, 2019.
American Idol—Renewed for an eighteenth season on May 13, 2019.
The Bachelor—Renewed for a twenty-fourth season on May 10, 2019.
Bachelor in Paradise—Renewed for a seventh season on August 5, 2019.
The Bachelorette—Renewed for a sixteenth season on August 5, 2019.
Black-ish—Renewed for a sixth season on May 2, 2019.
Bless This Mess—Renewed for a second season on May 10, 2019.
Card Sharks—Renewed for a second season on November 20, 2019.
Celebrity Family Feud—Renewed for a seventh season on November 20, 2019.
The Conners—Renewed for a second season on March 22, 2019, which is fully recovered from the firing of Roseanne star Roseanne Barr.
Dancing with the Stars—Renewed for a twenty-eighth season on February 5, 2019.
Fresh Off the Boat—Renewed for a sixth and final season on May 10, 2019.
The Goldbergs—Renewed for a seventh season on May 11, 2019.
The Good Doctor—Renewed for a third season on February 5, 2019.
The Great American Baking Show—Renewed for a fifth season on August 1, 2019.
The Great Christmas Light Fight—Renewed for a seventh season on October 18, 2018.
Grey's Anatomy—Renewed for a sixteenth and seventeenth season on May 10, 2019.
Holey Moley—Renewed for a second season on October 10, 2019.
How to Get Away with Murder—Renewed for a sixth and final season on May 10, 2019.
Match Game—Renewed for a fifth season on November 20, 2019.
A Million Little Things—Renewed for a second season on February 5, 2019.  
Modern Family—Renewed for an eleventh and final season on February 5, 2019.
Press Your Luck—Renewed for a second season on November 20, 2019.
The Rookie—Renewed for a second season on May 10, 2019.
Schooled—Renewed for a second season on May 11, 2019.
Shark Tank—Renewed for an eleventh season on February 5, 2019.
Single Parents—Renewed for a second season on May 10, 2019.
Station 19—Renewed for a third season on May 10, 2019.
To Tell the Truth—Renewed for a fifth season on November 20, 2019.

CBS
48 Hours—Renewed for a thirty-second on May 9, 2019.  
60 Minutes—Renewed for a fifty-second season on May 9, 2019.
The Amazing Race—Renewed for a thirty-second season on May 15, 2019.
Big Brother—Renewed for a twenty-first and twenty-second season on May 15, 2019.
Blood & Treasure—Renewed for a second season on June 26, 2019. It was announced on May 17, 2022, that the series would be moving to Paramount+.
Blue Bloods—Renewed for a tenth season on April 12, 2019.
Bull—Renewed for a fourth season on May 9, 2019.
Criminal Minds—Renewed for a fifteenth and final season on January 10, 2019.
FBI—Renewed for a second season on January 25, 2019.
God Friended Me—Renewed for a second season on January 29, 2019.
Hawaii Five-0—Renewed for a tenth and final season on May 9, 2019.
Love Island—Renewed for a second season on August 1, 2019.
MacGyver—Renewed for a fourth season on May 9, 2019.
Madam Secretary—Renewed for a sixth and final season on May 9, 2019.
Magnum P.I.—Renewed for a second season on January 25, 2019.
Man with a Plan—Renewed for a fourth season on May 10, 2019.
Mom—Renewed for a seventh and eighth season on February 5, 2019.
NCIS—Renewed for a seventeenth season on April 11, 2019.
NCIS: Los Angeles—Renewed for an eleventh season on April 22, 2019.
NCIS: New Orleans—Renewed for a sixth season on April 22, 2019.
The Neighborhood—Renewed for a second season on January 25, 2019.
SEAL Team—Renewed for a third season on May 9, 2019.
Survivor—Renewed for a thirty-ninth season on May 15, 2019.
S.W.A.T.—Renewed for third season on May 9, 2019.
Young Sheldon—Renewed for a third and fourth season on February 22, 2019.

The CW
The 100—Renewed for a seventh and final season on April 24, 2019.
All American—Renewed for a second season on April 24, 2019.
Arrow—Renewed for an eighth and final season on January 31, 2019.
Black Lightning—Renewed for a third season on January 31, 2019.
Bulletproof—Renewed for a second season on March 31, 2020.
Burden of Truth—Renewed for a third season on May 31, 2019.
Charmed—Renewed for a second season on January 31, 2019.
Dynasty—Renewed for a third season on January 31, 2019.
The Flash—Renewed for a sixth season on January 31, 2019.
In the Dark—Renewed for a second season on April 24, 2019.
Legacies—Renewed for a second season on January 31, 2019.
Legends of Tomorrow—Renewed for a fifth season on January 31, 2019.
Masters of Illusion—Renewed for a tenth season on March 31, 2020.
The Outpost—Renewed for a third season on October 14, 2019.
Pandora—Renewed for a second season on October 17, 2019.
Penn & Teller: Fool Us—Renewed for a seventh season on March 31, 2020.
Riverdale—Renewed for a fourth season on January 31, 2019.
Roswell, New Mexico—Renewed for a second season on April 24, 2019.
Supergirl—Renewed for a fifth season on January 31, 2019.
Supernatural—Renewed for a fifteenth and final season on January 31, 2019.
Two Sentence Horror Stories—Renewed for a second season on May 14, 2020.
Whose Line Is It Anyway?—Renewed for a sixteenth season on March 26, 2020.

Fox
9-1-1—Renewed for a third season on March 25, 2019.
Beat Shazam—Renewed for a fourth season on January 31, 2020.
Bob's Burgers—Renewed for a tenth season on February 12, 2019.
Empire—Renewed for a sixth and final season on April 30, 2019.
Family Guy—Renewed for an eighteenth season on February 12, 2019.
Gordon Ramsay's 24 Hours to Hell and Back—Renewed for a third season on July 26, 2019.
Hell's Kitchen—Renewed for a nineteenth and twentieth season on February 26, 2019.
Last Man Standing—Renewed for an eighth season on April 18, 2019.
The Masked Singer—Renewed for a second season on January 30, 2019 and for a third season on May 13, 2019.
MasterChef—Renewed for an eleventh season on August 6, 2019.
MasterChef Junior—Renewed for an eighth season on July 17, 2019.
Mental Samurai—Renewed for a second season on February 25, 2020.
The Orville—Renewed for a third season on May 11, 2019. It was announced on July 20, 2019 that the third season will air on Hulu due to production delays.
The Resident—Renewed for a third season on March 25, 2019.
The Simpsons—Renewed for a thirty-first and thirty-second season on February 6, 2019.
So You Think You Can Dance—Renewed for a seventeenth season on February 20, 2020.
Thursday Night Football—Renewed for a sixth season on January 31, 2018; deal will go to ninth season in 2022.

NBC
American Ninja Warrior—Renewed for a twelfth season on May 13, 2019.
America's Got Talent—Renewed for a fifteenth season on May 13, 2019.
America's Got Talent: The Champions—Renewed for a second season on May 11, 2019. 
The Blacklist—Renewed for a seventh season on March 11, 2019.
Blindspot—Renewed for a fifth and final season on May 10, 2019.
Brooklyn Nine-Nine—Renewed for a seventh season on February 27, 2019.
Chicago Fire—Renewed for an eighth season on February 26, 2019.
Chicago Med—Renewed for a fifth season on February 26, 2019.
Chicago P.D.—Renewed for a seventh season on February 26, 2019.
Ellen's Game of Games—Renewed for a third season on January 16, 2019.
Football Night in America—Renewed for a fourteenth season on December 14, 2011.
Good Girls—Renewed for a third season on April 12, 2019.
The Good Place—Renewed for a fourth and final season on December 4, 2018.
Law & Order: Special Victims Unit—Renewed for a twenty-first season on March 29, 2019.
Little Big Shots—Renewed for a fourth season on May 12, 2019.
Manifest—Renewed for a second season on April 15, 2019.
NBC Sunday Night Football—Renewed for a fourteenth season on December 14, 2011; deal will go to seventeenth season in 2022.
New Amsterdam—Renewed for a second season on February 4, 2019.
Songland—Renewed for a second season on September 10, 2019.
Superstore—Renewed for a fifth season on March 4, 2019.
This Is Us—Renewed for a fourth, fifth and sixth season on May 12, 2019.
The Titan Games—Renewed for a second season on September 16, 2019.
The Voice—Renewed for a seventeenth season on May 10, 2019.
Will & Grace—Renewed for an eleventh and final season on March 17, 2018.  
World of Dance—Renewed for a fourth season on May 11, 2019.

Cancellations/series endings

ABC
1969—The miniseries was meant to run for one season only; it concluded on May 28, 2019.
The Alec Baldwin Show—On January 4, 2019, ABC pulled the series from its prime-time schedule.
Child Support—The series concluded on December 14, 2018.
Dancing with the Stars: Juniors—Canceled on September 8, 2019.
The Fix—Canceled on May 10, 2019. The series concluded on May 20, 2019.
For the People—Canceled on May 9, 2019, after two seasons. The series concluded on May 16, 2019.
Grand Hotel—Canceled on October 1, 2019.
The Kids Are Alright—Canceled on May 10, 2019. The series concluded on May 21, 2019.
Reef Break—Canceled on December 13, 2019.
Speechless—Canceled on May 10, 2019, after three seasons.
Splitting Up Together—Canceled on May 10, 2019, after two seasons.
Whiskey Cavalier—Canceled on May 12, 2019. The series concluded on May 22, 2019.

CBS
The Big Bang Theory—It was announced on August 22, 2018 that season twelve would be the final season. The series concluded on May 16, 2019.
The Code—Canceled on July 23, 2019.
Elementary—It was announced on December 17, 2018 that season seven would be the final season. The series concluded on August 15, 2019.
Fam—Canceled on May 10, 2019.
The Good Fight—The broadcast television run was meant for one season only; it concluded on August 4, 2019. 
Happy Together—Canceled on May 10, 2019.
Instinct—Canceled on August 17, 2019, after two seasons. The series concluded on August 25, 2019.
Life in Pieces—Canceled on May 10, 2019, after four seasons. The series concluded on June 27, 2019.
Million Dollar Mile—The series concluded on August 3, 2019.
Murphy Brown—Canceled on May 10, 2019.
Ransom—Canceled on July 3, 2019, after three seasons.
The Red Line—Canceled on June 7, 2019.

The CW
Crazy Ex-Girlfriend—It was announced on April 2, 2018 that season four would be the final season. The series concluded on April 5, 2019.
I Ship It—On August 28, 2019, The CW pulled the show from its schedule and announced that no further episodes would air on the network. The remaining episodes were made available on CW Seed on the same day.
iZombie—It was announced on May 17, 2018 that season five would be the final season. The series concluded on August 1, 2019.
Jane the Virgin—It was announced on May 17, 2018 that season five would be the final season. The series concluded on July 31, 2019.

Fox
BH90210—Canceled on November 7, 2019.
The Cool Kids—Canceled on May 10, 2019. The series concluded the same day.
The Gifted—Canceled on April 17, 2019, after two seasons.
Gotham—It was announced on May 13, 2018 that season five would be the final season. The series concluded on April 25, 2019.
Lethal Weapon—Canceled on May 10, 2019, after three seasons.
Paradise Hotel—Canceled on August 7, 2019.
The Passage—Canceled on May 10, 2019.
Proven Innocent—Canceled on May 11, 2019.
Rel—Canceled on April 17, 2019.
Star—Canceled on May 10, 2019, after three seasons.
What Just Happened??! with Fred Savage—It was announced on August 8, 2019 that according to low ratings, a second season of the series was highly unlikely, rendering it as a de facto cancellation. The series concluded on September 1, 2019.

NBC

A.P. Bio—Canceled on May 24, 2019, after two seasons. Final episode aired on NBC on June 13, 2019. On July 17, 2019, it was announced that Peacock would pick up the series for another season.
Abby's—Canceled on May 30, 2019. The series concluded on June 13, 2019.
The Enemy Within—Canceled on May 30, 2019.
I Feel Bad—Canceled on May 10, 2019.
The InBetween—Canceled on November 1, 2019.
Midnight, Texas—Canceled on December 21, 2018, after two seasons, making it the first official cancellation of the season.
The Village—Canceled on May 30, 2019.

See also
2018–19 Canadian network television schedule
2018–19 United States network television schedule (daytime)
2018–19 United States network television schedule (late night)

Notes

References

United States primetime network television schedules
2018 in American television
2019 in American television